Adela mazzolella is a moth of the  family Adelidae. It is found in France, Spain, Germany, Austria, Italy, the Czech Republic, Slovakia, Poland, Hungary, Romania, Greece, Russia and Turkey.

The wingspan is 10–12 mm.

The larvae feed on lichen.

References

Moths described in 1801
Adelidae
Moths of Europe
Moths of Asia